Albrecht Wilhelm Roth (6 January 1757 – 16 October 1834) was a physician and botanist born in Dötlingen, Germany.

He studied medicine at the Universities of Halle and Erlangen, where he received his doctorate in 1778.
After graduation, he practiced medicine in Dötlingen, and shortly afterwards relocated to Bremen-Vegesack.

Roth is remembered for his influential scientific publications, particularly in the field of botany. His botanical research and writings came to the attention of Johann Wolfgang von Goethe (1749–1832), who recommended Roth to a position at the botanical institute at the University of Jena.

Two of his better written works were Tentamen florae germanica (a treatise on German flora), and Novae plantarum species praesertim Indiae orientalis (a book of Indian flora). The latter work is primarily based on botanical specimens collected by Moravian missionary Benjamin Heyne (1770–1819).

The botanical genus Rothia from the family Fabaceae is named after him.

Selected writings 
 Anweisung für Anfänger Pflanzen zum Nutzen und Vergnügen zu sammlen und nach dem Linneischen System zu bestimmen, 1778.
 Beyträge zur Botanik, 1782–1783
 Tentamen florae germanicae, 1788–1800
 Catalecta botanica  (with Franz Carl Mertens), 1797–1806
 Anweisung Pflanzen zum Nutzen und Vergnügen zu sammlen und nach dem Linneischen Systeme zu bestimmen, 1803.
 Novae plantarum species praesertim Indiae orientalis, 1821.
 Enumeratio plantarum phaenogamarum in Germania sponte nascentium, 1827
 Manuale botanicum, 1830

References

External links 
 

1757 births
1834 deaths
18th-century German physicians
19th-century German botanists
People from Oldenburg (district)
University of Halle alumni
University of Erlangen-Nuremberg alumni